The Lockheed Martin (previously Lockheed) KC-130 is a family of the extended-range tanker version of the C-130 Hercules transport aircraft. The KC-130J is the latest variant operated by the United States Marine Corps (USMC), with 48 delivered out of 79 ordered. It replaced older KC-130F, KC-130R, and KC-130T variants for aerial refueling. USMC reserve unit, VMGR-452 operated 12 KC-130T aircraft until May 2021; this was the last USMC reserve unit that operated the legacy KC-130s, completing the corps' transition to the more advanced Super Hercules.

Development
The KC-130F made its first test flight in January 1960 as the GV-1 under the old Navy designation system. First entering service in 1962, the KC-130F was designed to undertake aerial refueling missions in support of USMC aircraft. It was developed from the Lockheed C-130 Hercules.

The newest Hercules, the KC-130J, shares 55 percent of the same airframe as preceding models, but in fact is a greatly improved airplane.  It is based on the Lockheed Martin C-130J Super Hercules and provides significant increases in operational capability and performance margins over preceding KC-130F/R/T (legacy) aircraft.  Additionally, The KC-130J reduces cost of ownership through system reliability and reduced maintenance man-hours per flight hour.

The new HC-130J combat rescue tanker and MC-130J special operations tanker are both derived from a KC-130J baseline.

Technological development has led to the incorporation of interior/exterior night vision lighting, night vision goggle head-up displays, global positioning system, and jam-resistant radios. Some KC-130s are also equipped with defensive electronic and infrared countermeasures systems.

Design

The KC-130 is a multi-role, multi-mission tactical tanker/transport which provides the refueling support required by the USMC for its aircraft. This versatile asset provides in-flight refueling to both tactical aircraft and helicopters within a  operating radius, as well as rapid ground refueling when required. Additional tasks performed are aerial delivery of troops and cargo, emergency resupply into unimproved landing zones within the objective or battle area, emergency medical evacuation, tactical insertion of combat troops and equipment, and evacuation missions.

KC-130J
The KC-130J offers a 27,215 kg (60,000 lb) fuel capacity that it can allocate between its own flight requirements against aerial refueling offload capacity using its wing and external tanks while in the air. When more fuel is needed, an additional 11,064 kg (24,392 lb) of fuel can be offloaded from a specially configured internal fuselage 13,627 L (3,600-gallon) aluminum fuel tank. The system also functions without the fuselage tank, so the cargo compartment can be used for cargo on the same mission, giving the aircraft even greater flexibility.

The aircraft is ready to fuel fixed-wing, tilt-rotor, or rotary-wing aircraft using the standard probe and drogue technique. The two wing-mounted hose and drogue refueling pods (made by Sargent Fletcher) can each transfer up to 300 gallons (1,136 L) per minute to two aircraft simultaneously, allowing for rapid cycle times of multiple-receiver aircraft formations, a typical tanker formation of four aircraft in less than 30 minutes.

The KC-130J also provides for rapid ground refueling of helicopters, vehicles and fuel caches. The aircraft has a unique propeller feathering feature (known as "hotel mode", derived from the term hotel electric power, when a vessel or other means of transport is equipped with a power plant with the sole purpose of generating electric power for lighting, etc., rather than propulsion) which can slow (at 25% rotation speed) the propellers while the turbines continue to run and energize the generator, providing power to the electric fuel pumps. This reduction of the propellers' speed helps to eliminate prop wash behind the KC-130J. This allows ground forces to operate in relative calm while the aircraft offloads up to 2,271 L, 1,823 kg (600 gallons, 4,018 pounds) per minute.

The U.S. Marine Corps has chosen the KC-130J to replace its aging KC-130 legacy tanker fleet. The new KC-130J offers increased utility and much needed improvement in mission performance. As a force multiplier, the J-model tanker is capable of refueling both fixed- and rotary-wing aircraft as well as conducting rapid ground refueling. The refueling speed envelope has been widened from 100 to  indicated airspeed, offering more capability and flexibility. Offload rates per refueling pod can be up to 300 gallons (1,136 L) per minute simultaneously. The KC-130's offload is significantly greater than previous Hercules tankers. As an example, at 1,000 nautical miles (1,852 km), the fuel offload is well over 45,000 pounds (20,412 kg).

Harvest HAWK
With the addition of the Marine Corps's ISR / Weapon Mission Kit, the KC-130J will be able to serve as an overwatch aircraft and can deliver ground support fire in the form of Hellfire or Griffin missiles, precision-guided bombs, and eventually 30mm cannon fire in a later upgrade. This capability, designated as "Harvest HAWK" (Hercules Airborne Weapons Kit), can be used in scenarios where precision is not a requisite, such as area denial.

The AN/AAQ-30 Target Sight System (TSS) integrates an infrared and television camera, and is mounted under the left wing's external fuel tank. It is the same TSS used on the upgraded AH-1Z Viper attack helicopter. The typical loadout is four Hellfire missiles and 10 Griffin GPS guided missiles. The weapons systems operator uses a Fire Control Console mounted on an HCU-6/E pallet in the KC-130J's cargo compartment.

The aircraft retains its original capabilities in refueling and transportation. The entire system can be removed in less than a day if necessary. The USAF MC-130W Dragon Spear program uses a similar concept.

It was first test flown on 29 August 2009 by VX-20, and first deployed in October 2010 with VMGR-352.

Operational history

The KC-130 has supported operations in the Vietnam War, Operation Desert Shield, Operation Desert Storm, Operation Enduring Freedom, Operation Iraqi Freedom and other USMC operations over the last fifty years. It also participated in the Falklands War for Argentina.

VMGR-252, Cherry Point, NC, was the first fleet squadron to transition to the KC-130J.  Contrary to most military squadrons when they transition to a new aircraft, VMGR-252 did not "stand down" to train and equip for the new airframe.  Instead, they continued full-time fleet support with their "legacy" Hercs until fully converted to the J model. This trend was continued by squadrons as they transitioned to the KC-130J.

In February 2005, VMGR-252 made the first operational combat deployment of the KC-130J when six aircraft were deployed to Al Asad, Iraq in support of Operation Iraqi Freedom.  During this time VMGR-252 experienced many "firsts" with the new J model conducting aerial refueling, delivery of cargo and passengers, the first combat aerial delivery of supplies by any J model user (the USAF subsequently conducted aerial delivery in Afghanistan with their new J models later that year) and battlefield illumination.  VMGR-252 maintained the sole KC-130J presence for a year while VMGR-352 took delivery of and transitioned to the J model.  The semi-permissive threat environment and the state of the art defensive systems of the J model permitted it to operate over the battlefield, providing fuel for the jets close to the fight, versus the tanker being far behind the lines in relative sanctuary.  On more than one occasion VMGR-252 aircraft came under fire from insurgents, as did VMGR-352 aircraft during subsequent deployments to Iraq.

In 2006, VMGR-252 and 352 shared a joint detachment in Iraq and this paradigm continued for a number of years.  In the summer of 2006, VMGR-252 provided a two KC-130J detachment in support of the 24th Marine Expeditionary Unit (24MEU) to RAF Akrotiri in Cyprus during the Lebanon/Israeli conflict that summer.  Also during this time VMGR-252 began extensive operational training and tactics development with the new MV-22 Osprey, refining long range tanker procedures with the new tilt-rotor aircraft.

In Spring 2008, VMGR-252 again made KC-130J history by providing the KC-130J aircraft detachment to 24MEU as they reestablished the USMC presence in Kandahar, Afghanistan.  This deployment experienced numerous great KC-130J successes conducting all manner of expeditionary type missions routinely landing at austere dirt runways, tactical aerial delivery of goods, and the traditional logistic support and refueling missions that are the hallmark of USMC KC-130 support.

Though the USMC KC-130Js have left Iraq, a continuing KC-130J presence has now been maintained in support of Operation Enduring Freedom in Afghanistan, with aircraft and crews provided by both VMGR-252 and 352 during different periods.  In May 2009, the Okinawa-based "SUMOS" of VMGR-152 provided two aircraft and crews to support the OEF presence.  This was VMGR-152's first operational combat deployment since Vietnam, and they have been maintaining a continuing presence in Afghanistan with VMGR-352/252.

USMC KC-130J aircraft from VMGR-252 and 352 have additionally been deployed to Djibouti for operations in the Horn of African supporting counter-terrorist operations in the region.

After the 2010 Pakistan floods, KC-130Js from USMC VMGR-352 squadron delivered over 90,000 kg (200,000 lbs) of cargo across Pakistan in support of flood relief efforts.

The Harvest Hawk weapons system for USMC KC-130J aircraft began its first deployment during October 2010 in Afghanistan with Marine Aerial Refueler Transport Squadron 352 (VMGR-352). Its first weapons engagement was on 4 November supporting the 3rd Battalion 5th Marines in Sangin. One Hellfire missile was fired and five enemy insurgents were killed. The battle damage assessment stated there were no civilian casualties or property damage during the fire fight.

A KC-130J from the 26th MEU participated in a pilot rescue during Operation Odyssey Dawn.

Variants

KC-130B
Six C-130B models were modified into in-flight refueling tankers. 4 currently operating with the Republic of Singapore Air Force (all four to be upgraded to KC-130H standard), 2 with Indonesian Air Force.
KC-130F
Enhanced KC-130B, 46 built
KC-130H
Tanker variant of C-130H, 33 built. In addition to these, JASDF has modified several (at least three) of its C-130Hs to have aerial refueling capability and uses them to support its UH-60J rescue helicopters.
KC-130R
14 former USAF aircraft transferred to the U.S. Marine Corps. Six had refueling gear removed and were sold to the Japan Maritime Self-Defense Force as C-130R aircraft to replace their remaining YS-11M/M-A aircraft for troop and cargo movement, humanitarian efforts, transport of senior leaders, and medical evacuation. Regeneration began in November 2012 and was to be completed by Fall 2013.
KC-130T
Variant from C-130H, 28 built
KC-130T-30
Variant from C-130H-30, 2 built, transferred to the U.S. Navy and converted to C-130T-30s. 
KC-130J
Variant from C-130J

Operators

Current 

 Argentine Air Force
 1st Air Transport Squadron – El Palomar Air Base KC-130H

 Brazilian Air Force
 1º/1ºGT (1º Esquadrão do 1º Grupo de Transporte) – Galeão Air Force Base, Two KC-130H

 Chilean Air Force
 Grupo de Aviación N°10 (Santiago) four KC-130R delivered in 2016. Two in service as 2019.

 Royal Canadian Air Force
 435 Transport and Rescue Squadron operates 5 KC-130H as CC-130H(T)

 French Air Force
 Two KC-130Js on order and delivery in 2016.

 German Air Force
 Three KC-130Js on order. To be operated in a joint Franco-German squadron based at Évreux-Fauville Air Base in France.

 Indonesian Air Force
 Skadron Udara 32 operated 2 KC-130B. One crashed in 2015.

 Israeli Air Force
 103 "Elephants" Squadron at Nevatim KC-130H
 131 "Yellow Bird" Squadron at Nevatim KC-130H

 Italian Air Force
 46 Brigata Aerea, 2 Gruppo – Pisa-San Giusto operates 7 C-130J converted to KC-130J, 1 lost to crash

 Japan Maritime Self Defense Force
 Air Transport Squadron 61 (Fleet Air Force) operates six C-130R, converted from KC-130R
Japan Air Self-Defense Force
 1st Tactical Airlift Group operates at least three KC-130H

 Kuwait Air Force 42 Transport Squadron
 3 KC-130J in service, with an option to purchase three more

 Libyan Air Force
 7 are on order

 Royal Malaysian Air Force 20 Squadron
 4 KC-130T in service

 Royal Moroccan Air Force Air Transport Squadron
 Operates 2 KC-130H aircraft

Peruvian Air Force
Operates two KC-130H aircraft acquired from Spain in 2020.

 Royal Saudi Air Force
 32 Sqn based at Prince Sultan Airbase (KC-130H) : 5 KC-130J on order

 Republic of Singapore Air Force 122 Squadron
122 Squadron operates 4 KC-130B and 1 KC-130H. Upgraded by ST Aerospace with a new glass cockpit, avionics suite, and flight management system which makes the aircraft Global air-traffic management (GATM)-compliant. The KC-130Bs will also receive an auxiliary power unit and environmental control systems in common with C-130Hs.

Swedish Air Force
The Swedish air force operates 1 KC-130H tanker

 United States Marine Corps
VMGR-152 operates 14 KC-130J
VMGR-153 operates 2 KC-130J; recently re-activated January 2023
VMGR-252 operates 14 KC-130J
VMGR-352 operates 14 KC-130J
VMGR-234 operates 10 KC-130J (only reserve unit)
VMGR-452 decommissioned December 2022
VMGRT-253 decommissioned September 2006
 United States Navy
VX-20, a combined USN / USMC squadron, operates 1 KC-130J used for testing and evaluation, and 3 KC-130R for refueling USN and USMC aircraft conducting tests at NAS Patuxent River
VX-30 operates 3 KC-130F for refueling USN and USMC aircraft conducting tests on the NAVAIR Point Mugu Range; the KC-130Fs also conduct range clearing and safety surveillance
 United States Coast Guard
 6 Lockheed HC-130J – 5th Coast Guard District

Uruguayan Air Force
Operates two KC-130H aircraft acquired from Spain in 2020 to replace its two C-130B aircraft.

Former 

Spanish Air Force

Specifications (KC-130J)

See also

References

External links

C-130, K
C-130, K
KC-130 Hercules
Four-engined tractor aircraft
High-wing aircraft
Four-engined turboprop aircraft
Air refueling
KC-130